Valentin Ioan Borcea (born 6 July 2002) is a Romanian professional footballer who plays as an attacking midfield for Liga II side Dinamo București.

Career statistics

Club

References

External links
 
 

2002 births
Living people
Footballers from Bucharest
Romanian footballers
Association football midfielders
Liga I players
FC Dinamo București players